Akhteruzzaman Babu is a Bangladesh Awami League politician and the incumbent Member of Parliament of Khulna-6.

Early life
Haque was born on 11 August 1968 in Goroikhali, Paikgachha Upazila. His father was a school teacher. He spend his childhood in Paikgacha and later he moved in Khulna town.

Career
Currently Babu is a Member of Bangladesh National Parliament as well as Member, Science and Technology Parliamentary Committee. Babu was elected to parliament from Khulna-6 (Koyra-Paickgacha) as a Bangladesh Awami League candidate 30 December 2018. Before that, He hold different responsible post in Bangladesh Awami Jubo League at Khulna District, Former General Secretary of Khulna District Chatra League. He is a dynamic leader and blessed by Sheikh Family. Besides his political portfolio, He is the owner of M/S Jaman Enterprise.

Lifetime Membership
 Khulna Unnayan Songram Shomonnoy Committee
 Khulna Sishu Foundation
 Khulna Shilpokola Academy
 Hazi Kollyan Foundation

References

Awami League politicians
Living people
11th Jatiya Sangsad members
1968 births